This is a list of Estonian television related events from 1977.

Events

Debuts

Television shows

Ending this year

Births
20 May - Katrin Pärn, actress
8 December - Maarja Jakobson, actress

Deaths